Sidney Benjamin McClellan (11 June 1925 – 16 December 2000) was a professional footballer who played for Chelmsford City, Tottenham Hotspur, Portsmouth and Leyton Orient.

Football career 
McClellan joined Spurs from Chelmsford City in August 1949. A speedy, free-scoring inside forward he made his debut on 23 September 1950 against Sunderland. He was a member of the push and run side which won the 1950-51 Football League. McClellan played a total of 70 games and scored on 32 occasions in all competitions for the club. He joined Portsmouth in a £5,000 deal in November 1956 and featured in 37 Football League matches and scoring nine goals. McClellan ended his playing career at Leyton Orient, where he went on to make 12 appearances and score on four occasions. After retiring as a player he was the coach for the successful non-league side Dagenham and took them to the 1969-70 FA Amateur Cup Final.

References

External links 
Obituary
Sid McClellan

1925 births
2000 deaths
Footballers from Bromley-by-Bow
Chelmsford City F.C. players
Tottenham Hotspur F.C. players
Portsmouth F.C. players
Leyton Orient F.C. players
English Football League players
English footballers
Association football inside forwards